Eleuterio Francesco Fortino (April 21, 1938 – September 22, 2010) was an Italian priest of the Italo-Albanian Catholic Church. Fortino, who was ordained a Catholic priest on 1962, served as Archimandrite in the Eparchy of Lungro in Calabria. He also served as the Under Secretary of the Pontifical Council for Promoting Christian Unity from 1987 until his death on September 22, 2010. Additionally, he headed the Vatican office charged with improving relations with Orthodox Christianity for ten years.

He was awarded the "Silver Rose" in 2007 for his promotion of good relations between the Vatican and the Orthodox world. He was also the recipient of the Arberia Award in 2009.

Eleuterio Francesco Fortino died at the Tor Vergata hospital in Rome, Italy, on September 22, 2010, at the age of 72.

References

1938 births
2010 deaths
People from the Province of Cosenza
Italian people of Arbëreshë descent
Pontifical Council for Promoting Christian Unity